Chibi is a county-level city in southeastern Hubei province, China. Neighboring Wuhan in the north and Yueyang in the south, Chibi is called the "South Gate of Hubei". It is under the administration of Xianning prefecture-level city. Chibi was called Puqi until 11 June 1998, when the State Council approved its renaming to "Chibi" since it was the site of the famous Battle of Chibi that took place in the winter of 208/9 CE.

Population
In 1908, the entire county had a population of 185,004. In 1911, there were 42,455 families. In 1931, the county had 44,724 families and population of 181,640. In 1953, after the first national population census, the county had 50,746 families and population of 182,801. In 1964, the second national population census, the county had 58,055 families and population of 248,391. From 1961 to 1970, it is the second peak of population growth, after the third national population census, the county had 75,560 families and population of 387,789, when the birth rate was 18.24%, mortality rate was 6.69% and growth rate was 11.7%.

In 1982 when the third national census, the county 385,662 Han Chinese people, 99.45% of the total population, 2131 minority, 0.55% of the total population, of which 1929 Hui people,  51 Miao people, 49 Dong people, 21 Tujia people, 30 Zhuang people, 21 Manchu people, 6 Buyi people, 4 Tibetans,  3 Mongolians, 3 Yao people, 2 Uyghur and 2 Korean.

Administrative divisions
The administrative division of Chibi starts from the Song dynasty. From the Song dynasty to the Yuan dynasty, it named as township. In the Ming dynasty, it divided as a capital system. From the Qing dynasty to 1932, it changed to a township and group system. After 1949, the government of Chibi set up a district office as the county agency, managing several townships and communes. In 1975, it dismantled the district into a township and restored in 1984.

Chibi has jurisdiction over ten towns, a township, three subdistricts, an agriculture zone, three state-owned agriculture, forestry, tea, 152 village committees and 1,682 village groups.

Three subdistricts:
Puqi Subdistrict, Chimagang Subdistrict, Lushuihu Subdistrict

Ten towns:
Xindian, Zhaoliqiao, Cha'anling, Chebu, Chibi Town (or ), Liushanhu, Shenshan, Zhonghuopu, Guantangyi, 

The only township is Yujiaqiao Township

Other areas:
Pufang Industrial Park, Guantangyi Forestry, Yangloudong Tea Plantation, Canghu Development Area, Chibi Economic Development Area

Climate

Historic sites

References

Works cited

External links
中华人民共和国行政区划（1998年） 
Official website of Chibi Government

County-level divisions of Hubei
Cities in Hubei
Xianning